Sheyban, Iran is a city in Khuzestan Province, Iran.

Sheyban may also refer to:
 Sheyban, Sistan and Baluchestan
 Sheyban, West Azerbaijan